John C. Allen (May 21, 1907 – August 17, 1979) was a roller coaster designer who was responsible for the revival of wooden roller coasters which began in the 1960s. He attended Drexel University. He started working for the Philadelphia Toboggan Company in 1934 as a coaster operator and rose to become president of the company by 1954. He has designed more than 25 coasters and made significant contributions to roller coaster technology. He once said, "You don't need a degree in engineering to design roller coasters, you need a degree in psychology."

List of roller coasters
The following is a list of roller coasters were credited as designed by John C. Allen:

References

Further reading
John C. Allen at Encyclopædia Britannica

1907 births
1979 deaths
Roller coaster designers
Amusement ride manufacturers